Thomas Bliss (ca. 1647 – 8 October 1721) was an English Tory  politician who sat in the House of Commons in two periods between 1698 and 1708.

Bliss was elected Member of Parliament (MP) for Maidstone, where he owned a brewery, in 1698 and was returned unopposed in January 1701. In November 1701 he was re-elected despite a smear campaign which accused him of Jacobitism. In July 1702 he was defeated in the poll, but the election was declared void because of corruption by the Whigs and the writ for the constituency was suspended until 1704. Bliss was re-elected for Maidstone in 1704 and held the seat until 1708 when he did not stand.  His political battles continued in the borough where he was re-admitted as alderman in 1710 but declared as not chosen by the Whig majority in 1711.

References

1640s births
1721 deaths
Year of birth uncertain
People from Maidstone
Tory MPs (pre-1834)
English MPs 1698–1700
English MPs 1701
English MPs 1701–1702
English MPs 1705–1707
British MPs 1707–1708
Members of the Parliament of Great Britain for English constituencies